Çaylıoğlu is a belde (town) in Ereğli  district of  Zonguldak Province, Turkey. It is almost merged to Ereğli. The population of Çaylıoğlu is 1933 as of 2011. The settlement was founded in 1800s by a clan from Haymana in Ankara Province. The name of the settlement refers to the name of the clan. In 1950 s the main economic activity of  the settlement was services in manganese mines around. In 1996 it was declared a seat of township with the name Güneşli. However, in 2007 the former name was adopted.

References

Populated places in Zonguldak Province
Towns in Turkey
Populated places in Karadeniz Ereğli District